The 6th Politburo of the Chinese Communist Party was elected by the 6th Central Committee of the Chinese Communist Party in Moscow on July 19, 1928, during the Chinese Civil War.  It was followed by the 7th Politburo of the Chinese Communist Party.

The chairman was Xiang Zhongfa.  There would not be another Politburo Standing Committee of the Chinese Communist Party until almost after the end of the Second Sino-Japanese War.  This was preceded by the 5th Politburo of the Chinese Communist Party.

Members
Ordered in political position ranking
Su Zhaozheng
Xiang Ying
Zhou Enlai
Xiang Zhongfa
Qu Qiubai
Cai Hesen
Zhang Guotao

Alternate Members
Ordered in political position ranking
Guan Xiangying
Li Lisan
Luo Dengxian
Peng Pai
Yang Yin
Lu Futan
Xu Xigen

Standing Committee Members
Ordered in political position ranking
Su Zhaozheng
Xiang Zhongfa
Xiang Ying
Zhou Enlai
Cai Hesen

Standing Committee alternate members 
 Ordered in political position ranking
 Li Lisan
 Xu Xigen
 Yang Yin

External links
 Leaders of the 6th CCP Central Committee

Politburo of the Chinese Communist Party
1928 in China